Edwin Mosquera may refer to:
 Edwin Mosquera (weightlifter)
 Edwin Mosquera (footballer)